The 1952 Individual Speedway World Championship was the seventh edition of the official World Championship to determine the world champion rider.

Australian rider Jack Young became the first rider to win a second title (and the first to win two in a row) when he won his second straight World Championship after scoring 14 points. Second was Welshman Freddie Williams on 13 points, with England's Bob Oakley third on 12 points.

Qualification

Nordic Final
20 June 1952
 Växjö
 First 8 to Continental Final

Continental Final
22 June 1952
 Falköping
 First 8 to Championship Round

Championship Round

Venues
10 events in Great Britain.

Scores
Top 16 qualify for World final, 17th & 18th reserves for World final

World final

18 September 1952
 London, Wembley Stadium

Classification

Podium
   Jack Young (Australia)
   Freddie Williams (Wales)
   Bob Oakley (England)

References

1952
Individual Speedway
Individual Speedway
Individual Speedway
Speedway competitions in the United Kingdom